Patrick Hamilton (1504 – 29 February 1528) was a Scottish churchman and an early Protestant Reformer in Scotland. He travelled to Europe, where he met several of the leading reformed thinkers, before returning to Scotland to preach. He was tried as a heretic by Archbishop James Beaton, found guilty and handed over to secular authorities to be burnt at the stake in St Andrews as Scotland's first martyr of the Reformation.

Early life
He was the second son of Sir Patrick Hamilton of Kincavil and Catherine Stewart, daughter of Alexander, Duke of Albany, second son of James II of Scotland. He was born in the diocese of Glasgow, probably at his father's estate of Stanehouse in Lanarkshire, and was most likely educated at Linlithgow. In 1517 he was appointed titular Abbot of Fearn Abbey, Ross-shire. The income from this position paid for him to study at the University of Paris, where he became a Master of the Arts in 1520. It was in Paris, where Martin Luther's writings were already exciting much discussion, that he first learnt the doctrines he would later uphold. According to sixteenth century theologian Alexander Ales, Hamilton subsequently went to Leuven, attracted probably by the fame of Erasmus, who in 1521 had his headquarters there.

Return and flight
Returning to Scotland, Hamilton selected St Andrews, the capital of the Catholic Church in Scotland and of education, as his residence. On 9 June 1523 he became a member of St Leonard's College, part of the University of St Andrews, and on 3 October 1524 he was admitted to its faculty of arts, where he was first a student of, and then a colleague of the Renaissance humanist and logician John Mair. At the university Hamilton attained such influence that he was permitted, as precentor, to conduct a Solemn High Mass based on music of his own composition at the St. Andrew's Cathedral.

The reforming doctrines, however, 
had obtained a firm hold on the young abbot, and he was eager to communicate them to his fellow-countrymen.
Early in 1527 the attention of James Beaton, Archbishop of St Andrews, was directed to the heretical preaching of the young priest, whereupon he ordered that Hamilton should be formally tried. Hamilton fled to Germany, enrolling himself as a student, under Franz Lambert of Avignon, in the new University of Marburg, opened on 30 May 1527 by Philip of Hesse. Among those he met there were Hermann von dem Busche, one of the contributors to the Epistolæ Obscurorum Virorum, John Frith and William Tyndale.

Late in the autumn of 1527, Fr. Hamilton returned to Scotland, speaking openly of his convictions. He went first to his brother's house at Kincavel, near Linlithgow, where he preached frequently, and, soon afterwards, he renounced clerical celibacy and married a young lady of noble rank; her name is unrecorded. David Beaton, the Abbot of Arbroath, avoiding open violence through fear of Hamilton's powerful protectors, invited him to a conference at St Andrews. The Young minister, predicting that he was going to "confirm the pious in the true doctrine" by his death, accepted the invitation, and for nearly a month was allowed to preach and to debate.

With the publication of Patrick's Places in 1528, he introduced into Scottish theology Martin Luther's emphasis of the distinction of Law and Gospel.

Trial and execution

At length, he was summoned before a council of bishops and clergy presided over by the archbishop. There were thirteen charges, seven based on the doctrines in Philip Melanchthon's Loci Communes, the first theological exposition of Martin Luther's scriptural study and teachings in 1521. On examination Hamilton expressed a belief in their truth, and the council sentenced him to death on all thirteen charges. Hamilton was seized, and allegedly surrendered to the soldiery based on an assurance that he would be restored to his friends without injury. However, after a debate with Friar Campbell, the council handed him over to the secular power, to be burnt at the stake outside the front entrance to St Salvator's Chapel in St Andrews. The sentence was carried out on the same day to preclude any attempted rescue by friends. He burnt from noon to 6 p.m. and his last words were "Lord Jesus, receive my spirit". The spot is today marked with a monogram of his initials set into the cobblestones of the pavement of North Street.

Legacy
Hamilton's execution attracted more interest than ever before to Lutheranism and greatly contributed to the Reformation in Scotland. It was said that the "reek of Master Patrick Hamilton infected as many as it blew upon". Hamilton's fortitude during his execution persuaded Alexander Ales, who had been appointed to convince Hamilton of his errors, to enter into the Lutheran Church. His martyrdom is unusual in that he was almost alone in Scotland during the Lutheran stage of the Reformation. His only known writings, based upon Loci communes and known as "Patrick's Places", echoed the doctrine of justification by faith and the contrast between the gospel and the law in a series of clear-cut propositions.'"Patrickes Places"' was not Hamilton's own title, but was given in the translation into English by John Fryth in 1564, and are presented in Book 8 of the 1570 edition of John Foxe's "Acts and Monuments"..

Students at the University of St Andrews traditionally avoid stepping on the monogram of Hamilton's initials outside St Salvator's Chapel for fear of being cursed and failing their final exams. To lift the curse students may participate in the annual May dip where they traditionally run into the North Sea at 05.00 to wash away their sins and bad luck.

A school in Auckland, New Zealand called 'Saint Kentigern College' has a house named after Patrick Hamilton

Katherine Hamilton
Patrick's sister, Katherine Hamilton, was the wife of the Captain of Dunbar Castle and also a committed Protestant. In March 1539 she was forced in exile to Berwick upon Tweed for her beliefs. She had been in England before and met the Queen, Jane Seymour.

According to the historian John Spottiswood, Katherine was brought to trial for heresy before James V at Holyroodhouse in 1534, and her other brother James Hamilton of Livingston fled. The King was impressed by her conviction shown in her short answer to the prosecutor. He laughed and spoke to her privately, convincing her to abandon her profession of faith. The other accused also recanted for the time.

Bibliography

For a more extensive bibliography see George M. Ella's book review.

Mackay's bibliography:
Knox's Hist, of the Reformation ; 
Buchanan and Lindsay of Pitscottie's Histories of Scotland ; 
the writings of Alexander Alesius and the records of St. Andrews and Paris are the original authorities ; 
Life of Patrick Hamilton, by the Rev. Peter Lorimer, 1857, to which this article is much indebted ;
Patrick Hamilton, a poem by T. B. Johnston of Cairnie, 1873
 Rainer Haas, Franz Lambert und Patrick Hamilton in ihrer Bedeutung für die Evangelische Bewegung auf den Britischen Inseln, Marburg (theses) 1973
 The most recent biography in almost 100 years Patrick Hamilton – The Stephen of Scotland (1504-1528): The First Preacher and Martyr of the Scottish Reformation, by Joe R. D. Carvalho, AD Publications, Dundee 2009.

See also
 Scottish Reformation
 John Ogilvie (saint)
 List of Protestant martyrs of the Scottish Reformation

References
Citations

Sources

Attribution

External links
 

1504 births
1528 deaths
People executed for heresy
Executed Scottish people
Alumni of the University of St Andrews
University of Paris alumni
16th-century Scottish clergy
Scottish abbots
16th-century Protestant religious leaders
16th-century Protestant martyrs
People from Linlithgow
People from South Lanarkshire
People executed by the Kingdom of Scotland by burning
16th-century executions by Scotland
Scottish Reformation
Protestant martyrs of Scotland